Nigel Parsons is an Australian Paralympic athlete.  He won two gold medals at the 1988 Seoul Games in the Men's 4x100 m Relay A2A4–7 and Men's 4x400 m Relay A2A4–7 events.

References

Paralympic athletes of Australia
Athletes (track and field) at the 1988 Summer Paralympics
Paralympic gold medalists for Australia
Living people
Medalists at the 1988 Summer Paralympics
Year of birth missing (living people)
Paralympic medalists in athletics (track and field)
Australian male sprinters
Sprinters with limb difference
Paralympic sprinters